Fight Quest is a television show on the Discovery Channel that had a preview episode air on December 28, 2007 and began airing weekly on January 4, 2008. The show followed Jimmy Smith and Doug Anderson as they travel around the world learning different styles of martial arts, spending five days training with notable masters of the styles they are studying, before exhibiting what they have learned in a final demonstration and/or fight. According to quotes by the hosts, the show was mostly unscripted and a true challenge. At the end of February an updated DVD box set was released that included the final three episodes not in the original release. The series was canceled at the beginning of the second season and only three episodes aired, the last one ended on October 3, 2008.

Episodes

Season 1

Season 2

See also

 Fight Science
 Human Weapon
 Kill Arman
 Rallarsving
 Lucie Bertaud also had a similar show called Face a Face which was done in France.

References

External links
 Fight Quest's page on The Discovery Channel's website.
 Fight Quest's page on IMDB.
 Jimmy Smith's MMA fight record on Sherdog.

2007 American television series debuts
2008 American television series endings
Discovery Channel original programming
Martial arts television series
English-language television shows
Muay Thai television series
Television shows filmed in China
Television shows filmed in the Philippines
Television shows filmed in Japan
Television shows filmed in Mexico
Television shows filmed in Indonesia
Television shows filmed in France
Television shows filmed in South Korea
Television shows filmed in Brazil
Television shows filmed in Israel
Television shows filmed in California
Television shows filmed in Thailand
Television shows filmed in India